Radio Active is a radio comedy programme, broadcast on BBC Radio 4 during the 1980s.   The series grew out of a 1979 Edinburgh Festival Fringe show presented by The Oxford Revue and starred Angus Deayton, Geoffrey Perkins, Michael Fenton Stevens, Helen Atkinson-Wood and Philip Pope. The first episode was broadcast in 1980, and it ran for seven series.

Programme format

The show is based on a fictional radio station (described as "Britain's first national local radio station") and the programmes that it might transmit. Initially the radio station concept was used simply as a loose framing device for otherwise unlinked sketches and songs, but as the show developed, the episodes became more thematically focused, each one lampooning a different broadcasting genre and sometimes even a specific programme such as Down Your Way (parodied as "Round Your Parts"), In at the Deep End ("Out of Your Depth"), Ultra Quiz ("Gigantaquiz"), The Radio Programme ("The Radio Radio Programme") and Crimewatch ("Stop That Crime UK").

The programmes often pitch the "modern-media" regular characters against older stereotypes of foreigners and "establishment types" such as generals and politicians, though the programme rarely strays into the "alternative comedy" vogue of contemporary political comment. However some episodes in the final series made reference to real-life events: "Probe Round the Back" is a parody of investigative journalism which revolved around the Cambridge Five and contains allusions to Spycatcher and the Zircon affair, and "The Flu Special" satirises the then-current HIV/AIDS public awareness campaigns.

Characters

Most of the original characters on the show are named after pieces of sound equipment, including:

 rising star Mike Flex (Perkins),
 aged fading star Mike Channel (Deayton),
 "children's favourite" "Uncle" Mike Stand (Stevens)
 the food-obsessed Anna Daptor (Atkinson-Wood)

Also on the station's staff are:
 the incomprehensible and accident-prone Nigel Pry (Pope)
 the incompetent hospital-radio trained Martin Brown (Stevens)
 the carefully enunciated gag named "oh-so-daring" Mike Hunt (Deayton), whose daredevil stunts invariably turned out not to be as spectacular as he claimed
 brusque station owner Sir Norman Tonsil (Deayton), the name perhaps alluding to Norman Tebbit
 Norwegian correspondent Oivind Vinstra (Perkins), whose command of English was virtually limited to the phrase "and on with the music"
 Head of Religious Affairs The Right Reverend Reverend Wright (Deayton), who had a mail-order bride

Other recurring characters include:
 unsympathetic agony aunt Anna Rabies (known as "Joanna Jaundice" in series one, and "Claire Rabies" in series three) (Atkinson-Wood), the names perhaps alluding to Anna Raeburn and Claire Rayner
 singing doctor Philip Percygo (Pope)
 Luscivia, who ran the Radio Active gift shop (Atkinson-Wood)

The second series sees the characters become more defined, with Mike Channel revealed as the station's longest-serving presenter and resentful of the more popular younger hosts, especially Mike Flex, whom Channel frequently complained had taken "his" mid-morning show. At the same time, Nigel Pry gains the idiosyncratic speech patterns and propensity to injury that became his defining traits, and Mike Stand is effectively reinvented as a completely new character, changing from an old-school rock DJ in the first series, to a giggling, infantile children's presenter. Although he would come to be regarded as a main character, Martin Brown is not introduced until series 4, and was originally intended as a one-off character (he is so incompetent that during his first show, the station's other presenters are revealed to be listening in another studio and laying bets on how long it will take for Sir Norman to fire him – which duly happens at the end of the episode) but was so well-received that a brief appearance by the character was added to the final episode of the series, before he was brought back as a regular in the fifth series.

Writers

Angus Deayton and Geoffrey Perkins wrote most of the material. The first series was credited as written by Deayton, Perkins and Richard Curtis, as it drew on sketches written by Deayton and Curtis for the original stage show. Other significant additional contributions came from, at various times, Jon Canter, Terence Dackombe, Michael Fenton Stevens, Jack (then John) Docherty, Moray Hunter, and in the later series Jeremy Pascall (with whom Deayton and Perkins were concurrently writing The Uncyclopedia of Rock for Capital Radio). The musical elements were provided by Philip Pope. Four producers worked on the series over the years (Jimmy Mulville, Jamie Rix, Paul Mayhew-Archer and David Tyler).

Theme tune
The series theme tune is "Out To Lunch" by The Client, a 1979 RCA single (PB5214), originally used for a NatWest advert. The Client consisted of Ronnie Bond and Tom Parker.

Recurring elements

The show had its origins in the University of Oxford student drama community, especially in the musical parodies of Philip Pope, which were regularly featured on Radio Active. The best known of these is the Bee Gees parody The Hee Bee Gee Bees, with their song "Meaningless Songs (In Very High Voices)", which became a moderate 1980 hit.

Pope was also responsible for the very long and very contemporary jingles presenting the station telephone number for phone ins (with a false ending) and introducing the commercials. Each week's show has its own one-off jingles, which initially resembled the sort of generic jingles used by real radio stations, but later became elaborate musical pastiches in their own right.

The "commercials" feature many parodies of current TV adverts and other running jokes, including conversations between housewives Mary (Fenton Stevens putting on a high-pitched voice) and June (Atkinson-Wood); goods and services of dubious legality offered by "Honest Ron – the others are a con" (Stevens); and "blindingly obvious" patronising public service announcements ("Do not throw boiling water over a child").

Mike Flex presides over the rigged "Master Quiz" with ever-changing rules and format, although the prize remains the same: a chateau in the Loire Valley, which curiously goes un-won from week to week. The Radio Active Drama Repertory Company usually give a performance with wild misreadings of the scripts ("She's seriously one hundred and eleven. (Pause). She's seriously ill.") and miscued sound effects.

Each programme starts and ends with a comical handover to the Radio 4 continuity announcer.

Transmission
The original broadcasts took place on BBC Radio 4 between 1980 and 1988 (as detailed in the table below). One special from the same team (The Hee Bee Gee Bees Story) premiered on BBC Radio 2; uniquely this edition was presented as a straightforward mockumentary, narrated by disc jockey Paul Burnett.

Episodes from the series were repeated on Radio 4 in late 2002, and again on classic comedy radio station BBC 7 in 2003, late 2004, early 2005 and mid-2006 and again in 2007.

A new one-off episode of Radio Active, the first for 15 years, was broadcast on BBC Radio 4 in December 2002.

The third episode of series 7 ("The God Alone Knows Show") caused many complaints on its first transmission and so was edited for the mid-week repeat and all later broadcasts. In particular, in the broadcast church service near the start of the episode, the inability of any of the congregation to recite the Lord's Prayer correctly was replaced with a request for two girls in the front row to turn off their Sony Walkmans. The new translation of the Bible (by "Honest Ron") was also heavily edited; the new Ten Commandments were changed to remove two which were originally of a sexual nature (replaced by "thou shalt not listen to the Beastie Boys" and "thou shalt not support Arsenal"). A description of the cover (which Ron attempts to pass off as a depiction of Mary Magdalene, but is actually a reproduction or re-creation of the famous Tennis Girl poster) was deleted completely. To make up the lost time, the preceding article was lengthened with a few extra lines.

Television adaptation

The show transferred to TV as KYTV, which produced 20 episodes (a pilot, three series and one Children in Need special) between 1989 and 1993. The TV show was written and produced by largely the same team as had worked on Radio Active, and Angus Deayton, Helen Atkinson-Wood, Michael Fenton Stevens, Geoffrey Perkins and Phillip Pope again comprised the main cast.

Some of the Radio Active scripts and/or plot devices originally heard on the radio series were reused for the TV show, though the central setting changed from a local radio station to a satellite television broadcaster, and a number of new features and scenarios which parodied television convention were added. Spoof commercials continued to broadcast, along with parodies of the self-promotions and branding which were a common feature of television stations at this point.

Several key characters from Radio Active transferred to KYTV largely unchanged from their radio incarnations, including Mike Channel, Mike Flex, Anna Daptor and Martin Brown, who formed the central presentation team for KYTV's programmes; other characters including Anna Rabies and the Right Reverend Reverend Wright also transferred across. Phillip Pope's main character in KYTV was as the station's unnamed continuity announcer, although as with the radio series he (and the other regulars) appeared in multiple roles. The station's owner was again played by Deayton, though the character name was changed from Sir Norman Tonsil to Sir Kenneth Yellowhammer for the TV series, to serve as one of the show's thinly-veiled references to Sky TV.

Stage revival

In 2014, Angus Deayton appeared on the Radio 4 series The Frequency of Laughter to discuss Radio Active. When asked whether the show would ever be revived, he responded that it would be "awkward" without Geoffrey Perkins (who died in 2008) but "never say never". After seeing Neil Pearson's production of The Missing Hancocks at the Edinburgh Festival Fringe in 2015, Deayton felt that Radio Active could be revived in the same manner, with the stage show presented as a mock radio recording. The surviving original cast members subsequently appeared at the Fringe in August 2016 in a show using two radio scripts, "David Chizzlenut" and "Did You Catch It?". The "David Chizzlenut" section, recorded at the Fringe, was also broadcast as a one-off special on Radio 4.

The Radio Active team performed the same two episodes on a UK tour in 2019, with extra material added.

Episode list

Merchandise
Several cassette compilations, a 1983 LP, a CD of the first series, and a tie-in book have been released. The latter, the Radio Active Times (1986), was a mock-up and parody of the Radio Times. Later that same year, some Radio Active content was featured in The Utterly Utterly Merry Comic Relief Christmas Book. Some of the show's musical parodies were released as singles and albums under the Hee Bee Gee Bees name.

External links

Radio Active Remembered
Archived episodes

BBC Radio 4 programmes
BBC Radio comedy programmes
Fictional radio stations
Parody radio series
Radio programs adapted into television shows
1980 radio programme debuts
1987 radio programme endings